Angels of the Street or The Angel of St. Pauli is a 1969 West German crime film directed by Jürgen Roland and starring Horst Frank, Herbert Fux and Werner Pochath. It is set in the St. Pauli red light district of the port of Hamburg.

The film's sets were designed by the art director Dieter Bartels.

Cast
 Horst Frank as Jule Nickels
 Herbert Fux as Holleck
 Werner Pochath as Herbert Priel
 Karl Lieffen as Radensky
 Rainer Basedow as Clock-Five
 Gernot Endemann as Blinky
 Irmgard Riessen as Lisa Naumann
 Margot Mahler as Elli
 Christa Siems as Frieda
 Horst Hesslein as Mohr
 Uwe Carstens as Uwe
 Reinhold Timm
 Hans Waldherr
 Will Danin
 Denes Törzs as Rudi
 Jürgen Lier
 Mike Henning
 Jochen Sehrndt
 Günter Lüdke
 Jürgen Janza
 Will van Deeg as Quassel, Anwalt
 Karl-Ulrich Meves as Hansen
 Gabriele Scharon
 Esther Daniels
  as Kommissar Beringer

References

Bibliography 
 Bock, Hans-Michael & Bergfelder, Tim. The Concise CineGraph. Encyclopedia of German Cinema. Berghahn Books, 2009.

External links 
 

1969 films
Films set in Hamburg
West German films
German crime films
1969 crime films
1960s German-language films
Films directed by Jürgen Roland
Films about prostitution in Germany
1960s German films